Make a Move may refer to:

Make a Move (album), by Gavin DeGraw
Make a Move (film), a film directed by Niyi Akinmolayan, starring Ivie Okujaye
"Make a Move" (Incubus song)
"Make a Move" (The Black Seeds song)
"Make a Move" (Icon for Hire song)
"Wake Up (Make a Move)", a song by Lostprophets
"Make a Move on Me", a song by Olivia Newton-John

See also
Make Your Move (disambiguation)